Huntingdon was an electoral district of the Legislative Assembly of the Parliament of the Province of Canada, in Canada East, south of Montreal.  It was created in 1841 and was based on the previous electoral districts of L'Acadie and Laprairie in the Legislative Assembly of Lower Canada. It was represented by one member in the Legislative Assembly. 

The electoral district was abolished in 1867, upon the creation of Canada and the province of Quebec.

Boundaries 

The Union Act, 1840 had merged the two provinces of Upper Canada and Lower Canada into the Province of Canada, with a single Parliament.  The separate parliaments of Lower Canada and Upper Canada were abolished.Union Act, 1840, 3 & 4 Vict., c. 35, s. 2. 

The Union Act provided that while many of the pre-existing electoral boundaries of Lower Canada and Upper Canada would continue to be used in the new Parliament, some electoral districts would be defined directly by the Union Act itself.  Huntingdon was one of those new electoral districts. The Union Act merged the previous electoral districts of the County of L'Acadie and the County of Laprairie, to create a new district, called Huntingdon.

The former districts of Laprairie and L'Acadie had been defined by the 1829 boundaries as follows: 

The effect of the Union Act provision was to merge those two districts into one.  The new  district was located directly south of Montreal (now part of the Montérégie administrative region), extending from the Saint Lawrence south to the border with the United States.

Members of the Legislative Assembly 

Huntingdon was represented by one member in the Legislative Assembly.

The following were the members of the Legislative Assembly from Huntingdon.

Abolition 

The district was abolished on July 1, 1867, when the British North America Act, 1867 came into force, splitting the Province of Canada into Quebec and Ontario.  It was succeeded by electoral districts of the same name in the House of Commons of Canada and the Legislative Assembly of Quebec.

References 

Electoral districts of Canada East